Curling clubs in Manitoba are organized by Curl Manitoba (formerly the Manitoba Curling Association) into nine zones plus the city of Winnipeg. Zone boundaries are different for the Safeway Championship, however.

Winnipeg
Assiniboine Memorial Curling Club
Charleswood Curling Club
Deer Lodge Curling Club
East St. Paul Curling Club (in Zone 8)
Elmwood Curling Club
Fort Garry Curling Club
Fort Rouge Curling Club
Grain Exchange Curling Club*
Granite Curling Club
Heather Curling Club
Pembina Curling Club
Rossmere Golf and Country Club*
West St. Paul Curling Club
St. Vital Curling Club
Thistle Curling Club
Valour Road Curling Club*
Victoria Curling Club*
West Kildonan Curling Club*
West St. Paul Curling Club
Wildewood Curling Club*
* and italics indicates inactive or closed clubs.

Zone 1
Burntwood Curling Club - Thompson
Flin Flon Curling Club - Flin Flon
Gillam Curling Club - Gillam
Snow Lake Curling Club - Snow Lake
The Pas Curling Club - The Pas
Willow Park Curling Club - Flin Flon

Zone 2

Alonsa Curling Club - Alonsa
Bowsman Curling Club - Bowsman
Dauphin Curling Club - Dauphin
Gilbert Plains Curling Club - Gilbert Plains
Grandview Curling Club - Grandview
Roblin Curling Club - Roblin
Rorketon Curling Club - Rorketon
Ste. Rose Curling Club - Ste. Rose
Swan River Curling Club - Swan River

Zone 3

Brookdale Curling Club - Brookdale
Hamiota Curling Club - Hamiota
Kenton Curling Club - Kenton
Miniota Curling Club - Miniota
Minnedosa Curling Club - Minnedosa
Newdale Curling Club - Newdale
Rapid City Curling Club - Rapid City
Rivers Curling Club - Rivers
Shoal Lake Curling Club - Shoal Lake
Virden Curling Club - Virden
Wheat City Curling Club - Brandon

Zone 4

Boissevain Curling Club - Boissevain
Brandon Curling Club - Brandon
Deloraine Curling Club - Deloraine
Hartney Curling Club - Hartney
Killarney Curling Club - Killarney
Melita Curling Club - Melita
Riverview Curling Club - Brandon
Roseland Curling Club - Brandon
Souris Curling Club - Souris
Waskada Curling Club - Waskada
Wawanesa Curling Club - Wawanesa

Zone 5

Carberry Curling Club - Carberry
Cypress River Curling Club - Cypress River
Gladstone Curling Club - Gladstone
Glenboro Curling Club - Glenboro
Holland Curling Club - Holland
Lansdowne Curling Club - Lansdowne
Neepawa Curling Club - Neepawa
Normac Community Centre - MacGregor
Plumas Curling Club - Plumas
Portage Curling Club - Portage la Prairie
St. Claude Curling Club - St. Claude
Treherne Curling Club - Treherne

Zone 6

Altamont Curling Club - Altamont
Baldur Curling Club - Baldur
Cartwright Curling Club - Cartwright
Clearwater Curling Club - Clearwater
Glenora Curling Club - Baldur
Manitou Curling Club - Manitou
Miami Curling Club - Miami
Morden Curling Club - Morden
Somerset Curling Club - Somerset
St. Leon Curling Club - St. Leon
Swan Lake Curling Club - Swan Lake

Zone 7

Altona Curling Club - Altona
Carman Curling Club - Carman
Elm Creek Curling Club - Elm Creek
Emerson Curling Club - Emerson
Halbstadt Curling Club - Halbstadt
La Salle Curling Club - La Salle
Morris Curling Club - Morris
Roland Curling Club - Roland
St. Jean Curling Club - St. Jean Baptiste
Starbuck Curling Club - Starbuck
Winkler Curling Club - Winkler

Zone 8

Arborg Curling Club - Arborg
Argyle Curling Club - Argyle
Balmoral Curling Club - Balmoral
Eriksdale Curling Club - Eriksdale
Gimli Curling Club - Gimli
Moosehorn Curling Club - Moosehorn
Northern Interlake Curling Club - St. Martin
Petersfield Curling Club - Petersfield
Riverton Curling Club - Riverton
Rosser Curling Club - Rosser
Selkirk Curling Club - Selkirk
Stonewall Curling Club - Stonewall
Stony Mountain Curling Club - Stony Mountain
Teulon Curling Club - Teulon
Warren Curling Club - Warren
Winnipeg Beach Curling Club - Winnipeg Beach

Zone 9

Beausejour Curling Club - Beausejour
Bissett Curling Club - Bissett
Dufrost Curling Club - Dufrost
Grand Marais Curling Club - Grand Marais
Lac du Bonnet Curling Club - Lac du Bonnet
Lorette Curling Club - Lorette
Pinawa Curling Club - Pinawa
Pine Falls Curling Club - Pine Falls
St. Adolphe Curling Club - St. Adolphe
Ste. Anne Curling Club - Ste. Anne
Springfield Curling Club - Dugald
Steinbach Curling Club - Steinbach
Tyndall Curling Club - Tyndall
Victoria Beach Curling Club - Victoria Beach
Whiteshell Curling Club - Falcon Lake

References

 Manitoba
 
Curling clubs
Curling in Manitoba
Manitoba